The Childcare Payments Act 2014 is an Act of the Parliament of the United Kingdom that received Royal Assent on 17 December 2014, after being introduced on 5 June 2014. The purpose of the Act was to support working families by encouraging parents to take paid employment by offering  eligible parents to pay into an online childcare account which will be automatically topped up by the Government, therefore reducing the burden of childcare costs on such families.

Overview
The key provisions as defined by the legislation are:

 Her Majesty's Revenue and Customs (HMRC) will make top-up payments of 25% towards the costs of qualifying childcare into a specially designated childcare account.
 In order for the costs to qualify they must be in respect of care or supervised activity that is not in the course of compulsory education and the costs of such care are primarily to enable the person to work.
 In order to qualify for the top-ups a person (or partner) must be in the United Kingdom, aged over 16, responsible for the child, in paid work and must not be receiving Universal Credit or other government childcare support. In addition a person is not eligible if they and their partner have income in excess of £150,000

See also
 List of Acts of Parliament in the United Kingdom

References

United Kingdom Acts of Parliament 2014
Welfare in the United Kingdom
Child care